Debiganj is an upazila of Panchagarh District in the Division of Rangpur, Bangladesh.

Geography

It has 31532 households and total area 309.04 km2.

It is bounded by Boda and Panchagarh sadar upazilas on the north, Birganj, Khansama and Nilphamari sadar upazilas on the south, Domar upazila and West Bengal state of India on the east, Thakurgaon sadar and Boda upazilas on the west.

Demographics
As of the 1991 Bangladesh census, Debiganj has a population of 159902. Males constitute 51.02% of the population, and females 48.98%. This Upazila's eighteen up population is 77660. Debiganj has an average literacy rate of 24.8% (7+ years), and the national average of 32.4% literate.

Administration
Debiganj Thana was formed in 1928 and it was turned into an upazila on 28 March 1983.

The Upazila is divided into ten union parishads: Chengthi Hazradanga, Chilahati, Dandopal, Debiduba, Debiganj, Pamuli, Shaldanga, Sonahar Mollikadaha, Sundardighi, and Tepriganj. The union parishads are subdivided into 108 mauzas and 101 villages.

Education

Nripendra Narayan Government High School, founded in 1906, is a notable secondary school in the upazila.

Aladini Government Girls' High School is a secondary government high school here. It also has a reputed college. Overall Debiganj has 68 govt and non-govt high schools and 10 colleges. Some of them are -
 Sonahar Girls High School 
 Sonahar High School
 Khariza Sonahar High School
 Saldanga High School
 TZ High School

6. Nripendra Narayan  Govt High School

7. Debigonj Aulodini Girls High School

8. Debigonj Girls' High School

9. Debigonj Pailot High School.

References

Upazilas of Panchagarh District